Mazanovsky District is an administrative and municipal district (raion), one of the twenty in Amur Oblast, Russia. Its administrative center is the rural locality (a selo) of Novokiyevsky Uval. Population:  16,028 (2002 Census);  The population of Novokiyevsky Uval accounts for 29.2% of the district's total population.

Geography
River Selemdzha and its tributaries Ulma and Orlovka flow across the district.

Villages and settlements
Abaykan

References

Notes

Sources

Districts of Amur Oblast